Võ Nguyên Hoàng (born 7 February 2002) is a Vietnamese football player who plays for V.League 2 side Phố Hiến.

Career statistics

Club

Notes

International goals

Vietnam U16

Vietnam U19

Honours
Vietnam U15
 AFF U-15 Championship: 2017
Vietnam U23
 AFF U-23 Championship: 2022

References

2002 births
Living people
Vietnamese footballers
Vietnam youth international footballers
Association football forwards
V.League 1 players